The 1903 Tulane Olive and Blue football team represented Tulane University during the 1903 Southern Intercollegiate Athletic Association football season.

Schedule

References

Tulane
Tulane Green Wave football seasons
Tulane Olive and Blue football